A list of the works of American science fiction author Michael Flynn.

Novels

 Fallen Angels (with Larry Niven and Jerry Pournelle) (1991) (Prometheus Award, Seiun Award)

 The Wreck of the River of Stars (2003)
 Eifelheim (2006) (Hugo nomination 2007)
 The Shipwrecks of Time (forthcoming)
 The Chieftain (forthcoming)

Firestar Universe

Firestar Series
 Firestar (1996)
 Rogue Star (1998)
 Lodestar (2000)
 Falling Stars (2001)

Spiral Arm Series
 The January Dancer (2008)
 Up Jim River (2010)
 In the Lion's Mouth (2012)
 On the Razor's Edge (2013)

Short fiction
Collections
 The Nanotech Chronicles (1991)
 The Forest of Time and other stories (1997)
 Captive Dreams (2013)
Stories

 "Eifelheim" (1986) (nominee for Best Novella Hugo Award, 1987)
 "The Forest of Time" (1987) (Hugo Best Novella nominee, 1988)
 "The Adventure of the Laughing Clone" (1988)
 "From the corner of the eye" Analog 113/13 (November 1993)
 "Melodies of the heart" Analog 114/1&2 (January 1994 (Hugo Best Novella nominee, 1995)
 "The promise of God" F&SF 88/3 [526] (Mar 1995)
 "House of Dreams" (October–November 1997, Asimov's Science Fiction) won a Theodore Sturgeon Award in 1998.
 "Southern Strategy" (2002) Published in the collection, Alternate Generals II, 2002, ed. Harry Turtledove, Baen Books
 "The Ensorcelled ATM" (2005) Published in the anthology The Enchanter Completed, 2005, ed. Harry Turtledove, Baen Books
 "Dawn, and Sunset, and the Colours of the Earth" (Asimov's October/November 2006), Hugo nomination 2007
 "Quaestiones Super Caelo et Mundo" Analog 127/7&8 (July/August 2007), Sidewise Award for Alternate History
 "Sand and Iron" Analog 128/7&8 (July/August 2008) : 86-100
 "Where the Winds are all Asleep" Analog 129/10 (October 2009) : 8-32
 "On Rickety Thistlethwaite" Analog 130/1&2 (January/February 2010) : 62-71
 "Cargo" Analog 130/6 (Jun 2010) : 78-85
 "The Frog Prince" Analog 131/1&2 (January/February 2011) : 126-147
 "The Iron Shirts" Tor.com (May 2011)
 "The Journeyman: On the Short-Grass Prairie" Analog 132/10 (October 2012)

Non fiction
 "De revolutione scientarium in 'media tempestas'" Analog 127/7&8 (Jul/Aug 2007)

Notes

Bibliographies by writer
Bibliographies of American writers
Science fiction bibliographies